The Journal of Gender Studies is a leading British peer-reviewed journal for interdisciplinary gender studies, published by Routledge. It has been published since 1991, and publishes articles relating to gender from a feminist perspective covering a wide range of disciplines. It aims to create a dialogue among the different academic fields that engage with ideas and theories of gender.

According to the Journal Citation Reports, its 2020 impact factor is 2.539.

See also 
 List of women's studies journals

References

Gender studies journals
Publications established in 1991
Quarterly journals
Sociology journals
Taylor & Francis academic journals
Women's studies journals
1991 establishments in the United Kingdom